Pal College was an independent school located in , a south-western suburb of Sydney, New South Wales, Australia. Established in 2005 by Seth Pal, Pal College had at one time an enrolment of an estimated 200+ students from Years 7 to 12.

Pal College was ranked 97th in the 2008 "Top 200" HSC Schools in New South Wales.

The school was closed in 2011.

See also 
 List of non-government schools in New South Wales

References

Defunct schools in New South Wales
Educational institutions established in 2006
2006 establishments in Australia
2011 disestablishments in Australia
Educational institutions disestablished in 2011